John Zeleny (March 26, 1872 – June 19, 1951) was an American physicist who, in 1911, invented the Zeleny electroscope. He also studied the effect of an electric field on a liquid meniscus. His work is seen by some as a beginning to emergent technologies like liquid metal ion sources and electrospraying and electrospinning.

Zeleny was born in Racine, Wisconsin to a Czech immigrant couple from Křídla. He was the older brother of Charles Zeleny. He attended the  University of Minnesota (B.S., 1892), followed by Trinity College, Cambridge (B.A., 1899), and the University of Minnesota (PhD, 1906). Zeleny began his teaching career at the University of Minnesota after earning his B.A. in 1892. In 1915, he joined the faculty at Yale, where he was chairman of the physics department and director of graduate studies in physics until his retirement in 1940.

References

External links
Zeleny Electroscope

American physicists
American people of Czech descent
1872 births
1951 deaths
People from Racine, Wisconsin
University of Minnesota alumni
Alumni of Trinity College, Cambridge
University of Minnesota faculty
Yale University faculty
Presidents of the American Physical Society